Kampung Datuk Keramat or more commonly referred to as Keramat (old name - Tangga Cina) among the locals is a large zone in the Titiwangsa constituency, falling within the boundary of the Federal Territory of Kuala Lumpur, Malaysia. It is located northeast of downtown Kuala Lumpur and borders the district of Ampang in Selangor. The Klang River runs roughly from northeast to the west and acts as a natural divider of Keramat and Ampang.

Keramat, along with Kampung Baru, which is a 10 minutes drive away, has traditionally been a Malay majority area, being a Malay reserve area.

Education
 Primary Schools
Schools in the area include Sekolah Kebangsaan Datuk Keramat, a primary school. The other nearby school is SK Polis Depot opposite to SK Jalan Padang Tembak, SK Jalan Gurney near to Utm Semarak and SK Kementah located in Mindef, SK Desa Tun Hussein Onn also located in DTHO that share land property with Mindef.

 Secondary Schools
SMK Seri Ampang aka Ampang Boys, to get to this school mostly the students stopped at LRT Datuk Keramat before walking in a bridge connected to Jalan Ampang over the Klang River. SMK Puteri Ampang also located at the same exact location. SMK Jalan Padang Tembak located near to the Pulapol. Meanwhile, SMK Desa Tun Hussein Onn placed in Mindef property land.

Some parents also sent their children to nearby primary and secondary school outside the region such as SK Setiawangsa which known for top education school amongst primary school student and recognized as one of best primary school in KL. SK 2 Taman Keramat in Keramat AU1. There's minority of teenagers there went to secondary school such as in SMK Taman Setiawangsa, SMK Taman Keramat, SMK Wangsa Maju Sesyen 5.

Transportation
Keramat is served by three light rail transit stations as part of the Kelana Jaya Line. The three stations are Jelatek, Dato' Keramat and Damai.

Notable people

 Razip Ismail – ex footballer, former head coach of KL FA, Harimau muda, Pahang, Perlis, Ministry of finance fc.
 Dato Yusoff Haslam (actor, director & film producer)
 Dato Aznil Haji Nawawi (TV presenter, host & entertainer)
 KRU - Norman Abd Halim (KRU studios CE0), Yusri Abd Halim (film director), Edry Abd Halim (music producer)
 Awie - musician, singer, actor
 Roslan Aziz - Music composer, producer
 Norliah Ghani - Actresses, mother of Rusdi Ramli (actor)
 Zamani Slam

Al-Arqam
The religious Cult, Al Arqam began in Datuk Keramat before relocating to Sg Penchala.

Marketplace

Keramat Mall
Keramat Mall houses a wet market, a dry market, a food court, a multipurpose hall and parking bays. The cost of the project was RM70 million. However, Keramat Mall is far from being the buzzing marketplace it was envisioned to be due to the mall being "neither trader friendly or consumer friendly". In 2013, a Mini Urban Transformation Centre (UTC) was set-up in the marketplace.

References

See also
 Kampung Padang Balang

Suburbs in Kuala Lumpur
Villages in Kuala Lumpur